Josephus Lyles (born 22 July 1998) is an American sprinter. He attended T. C. Williams High School in Alexandria, Virginia.

In July 2016, Josephus and his older brother Noah turned professional and signed with Adidas.

His parents Keisha Caine and Kevin Lyles competed in Track and Field at Seton Hall University.

References

External links
 
 

1998 births
Living people
Sportspeople from Alexandria, Virginia
Track and field athletes from Florida
Sportspeople from Gainesville, Florida
American male sprinters
African-American male track and field athletes
T. C. Williams High School alumni
21st-century African-American sportspeople